"Doo Wa Ditty (Blow That Thing)" / "A Touch of Jazz (Playin' Kinda Ruff Part II)" is a single performed by Zapp, issued as the lead single from their second studio album Zapp II. "Doo Wa Ditty" is the third track on the album, while "A Touch of Jazz" is the closing track on the album. The single peaked at No. 10 on the Billboard R&B singles chart in 1982.

The song "Doo Wa Ditty (Blow That Thing)" has been sampled  on "Do U Wanna Roll (Dolittle Theme)" (2001), a track by R.L., Snoop Dogg and Lil' Kim from the Dr. Dolittle 2 soundtrack.

Chart positions

References

External links
 
 
 

1982 songs
1982 singles
Songs written by Larry Troutman
Songs written by Roger Troutman
Song recordings produced by Roger Troutman
Warner Records singles
Zapp (band) songs